The Shah Abbasi Caravansarai is a historical caravanserai located in Bisotun in Kermanshah Province, Iran. This caravanserai was listed as an Iranian national heritage on August 4, 1974. The caravanserai of Bisotun was constructed by order of Shah Abbas I. There is an inscription from Shah Suleiman.

References

External links 

National works of Iran
Tourist attractions in Kermanshah Province
Safavid Iran
Caravanserais in Iran